KCLU  may refer to:

 KCLU (AM), a radio station (1340 AM) licensed to Santa Barbara, California, United States
 KCLU-FM, a radio station (88.3 FM) licensed to Thousand Oaks, California, United States